The Montserrat national basketball team is organized and run by the Montserrat Basketball Association.

International performance

FIBA AmeriCup
yet to qualify

Caribbean Championship
yet to participate

Roster

Coaches
Head coach- Randolph Lewis

Team Manager-Jermaine Wade

Coach-Bevon Greenaway

References

External links
Official website Montserrat Amateur Basketball Association
Basketball News Discover Montserrat
Montserrat Basketball Facebook presentation

 
Men's national basketball teams
1986 establishments in Montserrat